Drop Dead Divas sixth and final season premiered March 23, 2014, and concluded on June 22, 2014, on Lifetime. Season six aired on Sundays at 9:00 pm ET (6:00 pm PT) and consisted of 13 episodes.

Cast

Main cast
 Brooke Elliott as Jane Bingum (13 episodes)
 Margaret Cho as Teri Lee (7 episodes)
 Jackson Hurst as Grayson Kent (11 episodes)
 Kate Levering as Kim Kaswell (10 episodes)
 April Bowlby as Stacy Barrett (13 episodes)
 Lex Medlin as Judge Owen French (13 episodes)
 Justin Deeley as Paul (9 episodes)

Recurring cast
 Jeffrey Pierce as Ian Holt/Grayson Kent (4 episodes)
 Kenny Alfonso as Joe Cummings (4 episodes)
 Victor McCay as Judge Halloran (4 episodes)
 Rhoda Griffis as Paula Dewey (3 episodes)
 Gregory Alan Williams as Judge Warren Libby (3 episodes)
 Virginia Williams as Belinda Scotto (2 episodes)
 Mike Faiola as Dave (2 episodes)

Guest stars
 Colin Egglesfield as Charlie French (1 episode)
 Corbin Bleu as Michael Donaldson (1 episode)
 Stephen "tWitch" Boss as Billy Donaldson (1 episode)
 Rick Springfield as Liam Matthews (1 episode)
 Janel Parrish as Chelsea Jones (1 episode)
 Roma Maffia as Judge Eileen Sears (1 episode)
 Ben Feldman as Fred (1 episode)
 Becca Tobin as Empress Katia (1 episode)
 Terry Fator as Greg Gerlin (1 episode)
 David Mazouz as Ryan Hatcher (1 episode)

Production
On October 25, 2013, Lifetime and Sony Pictures TV renewed the series for a sixth season, which premiered on March 23, 2014. Colin Egglesfield, Virginia Williams, and Corbin Bleu guest starred in the season premiere while Rick Springfield and Jay DeMarcus guest starred later in the season. S. Epatha Merkerson and John Ratzenberger reprised their roles. Stephen "tWitch" Boss guest starred as Billy Donaldson, a man who hires Jane to help his brother, in the second episode. Janel Parrish will guest star in the fifth episode as a cheerleader who finds internet fame after her on-field meltdown becomes a viral video.

Episodes

References

External links
 Drop Dead Diva on Lifetime
 

2014 American television seasons